The 2011–12 Scottish Premier Under 19 League (also known as the Clydesdale Bank Under-19 Premier League due to sponsorship reasons) was the fourteenth season of the Scottish Premier Under-19 League, the highest youth Scottish football league. It commenced in August 2011 and finished in May 2012. The defending champions were Celtic, who retained the title for the third year running.

League table

Results
Teams play each other twice, once at home, once away

External links
2011–12 Scottish Premier Under-19 League at Scotprem

Prem
SPFL Development League